High technology (high tech), also known as advanced technology (advanced tech) or exotechnology, is technology that is at the cutting edge: the highest form of technology available. It can be defined as either the most complex or the newest technology on the market. The opposite of high tech is low technology, referring to simple, often traditional or mechanical technology; for example, a slide rule is a low-tech calculating device. When high tech becomes old, it becomes low tech, for example vacuum tube electronics.

The phrase was used in a 1958 The New York Times story advocating "atomic energy" for Europe: "... Western Europe, with its dense population and its high technology ...."  Robert Metz used the term in a financial column in 1969, saying Arthur H. Collins of Collins Radio "controls a score of high technology patents in a variety of fields." and in a 1971 article used the abbreviated form, "high tech."

A widely used classification of high-technological manufacturing industries was provided by the OECD in 2006. It is based on the intensity of research and development activities used in these industries within OECD countries, resulting in four distinct categories.

Startups working on high technologies (or developing new high technologies) are sometimes referred to as deep tech; the term may also refer to disruptive innovations or those based on scientific discoveries.

High-tech, as opposed to high-touch, may refer to self-service experiences that do not require human interaction.

See also

 Electronics
 Electronics industry
 Photonics industry
 Nuclear technology
 Quantum technology
 Intermediate technology – sometimes used to mean technology between low and high technology
 Industrial design
 List of emerging technologies
 Semiconductor industry
 Big Tech
Innovation

References

Technology by type
Design